Trishtubh is a Vedic metre of 44 syllables (four padas of eleven syllables each), or any hymn composed in this metre. It is the most prevalent metre of the Rigveda, accounting for roughly  40% of its verses.

The Trishtubh pada contains a "break" or caesura, after either four or five syllables, necessarily at a word-boundary and if possible at a syntactic break, followed by either three or two short syllables. The final four syllables form a  trochaic cadence. For example RV 2.3.1:

"Agni is set upon the earth well kindled
he standeth in the presence of all beings.
Wise, ancient, God, the Priest and Purifier
let Agni serve the Gods for he is worthy."
(trans. Griffith; the translator attempts to imitate the meter in English)

This is to be read metrically as follows, with  marking the caesura and  separating the cadence:

The Avesta has a parallel stanza of 4x11 syllables with a caesura after the fourth syllable.

Trishtubh verses are also used in later literature, its archaic associations used to press home a "Vedic" character of the poetry. The Bhagavad Gita, while mostly composed in shloka (developed from the Vedic anushtubh) is interspersed with Trishtubhs. A particularly long section of Trishtubhs is chapter 11, verses 15-50.

Notes

References
 E. V. Arnold, Vedic Metre in its Historical Development, 1905
 E. W. Hopkins, The Great Epic of India, 1901

See also
Anustubh
Vedic meter

Sanskrit words and phrases
Poetic rhythm